Phyllonorycter alnicolella is a moth of the family Gracillariidae. It is known California and Maine in the United States and Ontario and Quebec in Canada.

The wingspan is about 6 mm.

The larvae feed on Alnus incana. They mine the leaves of their host plant. The mine has the form of a blotch mine on the upperside of the leaf.

References

alnicolella
Moths of North America

Leaf miners
Lepidoptera of Canada
Lepidoptera of the United States
Moths described in 1889
Taxa named by Thomas de Grey, 6th Baron Walsingham